Bang. En roman om Herman Bang (lit. Bang. A Novel About Herman Bang) is a 1996 novel by Danish author Dorrit Willumsen about Herman Bang. It won the Nordic Council's Literature Prize in 1997.

References

1996 Danish novels
Danish-language novels
Nordic Council's Literature Prize-winning works